Davron Mirzaev (born 8 February 1989, in Tashkent) is an Uzbekistani footballer who last played for Rubin Yalta in the Crimean Premier League. He also holds Russian citizenship.

Career
In March 2014, Mirzaev signed a one-year contract with FC Istiklol.

In November 2014, Mirzaev was reported to be training with Pakhtakor Tashkent.

During the summer of 2015, Mirzaev joined Crimean Premier League side Rubin Yalta, leaving them on 15 December of the same year.

After his release from Rubin Yalta, Mirzaev went on trial with Belshina Bobruisk, but did not earn a contract.

References

External links
 Profile on rubin-kazan.ru
 Rubin Yalta Profile

1989 births
Living people
Uzbekistani footballers
FC Rubin Kazan players
Pakhtakor Tashkent FK players
Expatriate footballers in Russia
Association football midfielders
Uzbekistani expatriate footballers
Russian Premier League players
Uzbekistani expatriate sportspeople in Russia
FC Khimki players
FC Istiklol players
Footballers at the 2010 Asian Games
FC Neftekhimik Nizhnekamsk players
Asian Games competitors for Uzbekistan
Tajikistan Higher League players